Luciana Saccol (born 23 January 1956) is a former Italian female middle-distance runner and cross-country runner who competed at individual senior level at the World Athletics Cross Country Championships (1980).

References

External links
 
 Tribute to Luciana Saccol at YouTube

1956 births
Living people
Italian female middle-distance runners
Italian female cross country runners
Sportspeople from the Province of Treviso
People from Pieve di Soligo